Zuzana Pincová is a Czech former football goalkeeper, who represented her country 63 times between 1993 and 2007.

She played for the Czech national team. She made her debut on 21 June 1993 in a match against Slovakia.

Pincová was voted footballer of the year at the 2005 Czech Footballer of the Year (women).

References

1973 births
Living people
Czech women's footballers
Czech Republic women's international footballers
Women's association football goalkeepers
AC Sparta Praha (women) players
Czech Women's First League players